= Tyumen Urban Okrug =

- District
- Coordinates: 57°09′20″N 65°33′44″E
- Country: Russia
- Federal subject: Tyumen Oblast
- Established: 5 November 2004
- Administrative center: Tyumen
- Time zone: UTC+5 (MSK+2)
- OKTMO ID: 71701000

Tyumen Urban Okrug is an urban okrug in Tyumen Oblast, Russia. The administrative center is Tyumen.
